The Taiwan People's Communist Party is a minor political party in Taiwan. It was founded on 4 February 2017 by businessman Lin Te-wang, and was the sixth party with "communist" in its name to register with the Ministry of the Interior.

History 
Before establishing the Taiwan People's Communist Party, Lin Te-wang was a member of the Kuomintang's central committee. Lin sought the Kuomintang's nomination for Tainan City Constituency 1 in the 2016 legislative election, but the party declined. He subsequently left the Kuomintang and ran unsuccessfully as an independent.

Disgruntled with both the Kuomintang and the Democratic Progressive Party, Lin established the Taiwan People's Communist Party a year later, on 4 February 2017. Lin originally applied for party registration under the name "Communist Party of China in Taiwan", but was told by the Ministry of Interior that the name could not be used due to existing laws on Cross-Strait relations. The party's inaugural meeting was held on 4 February 2017 in Sinying District, Tainan.

In the run-up to the 2020 legislative election, the Taiwan People's Communist Party was accused of vote buying with money channeled from mainland China. Tainan authorities launched a preliminary investigation after being tipped off and raided the party's offices on 30 December 2019. Sixty party members were detained for questioning. According to the prosecution, the party's leadership took several Tainan residents on trips to Jiangsu Province in exchange for their votes.

Ideology 
The stated purpose of the Taiwan People's Communist Party is to "advocate modern socialism for economic development, adhere to the 1992 Consensus ('One China' Consensus), and promote Cross-Strait peace."

See also 
 Taiwan Democratic Communist Party
 United Front in Taiwan

Notes

References 

2017 establishments in Taiwan
Political parties established in 2017
Communist parties in Taiwan
Chinese nationalist political parties